{{Infobox Wrestling event
|name=Road Wild (1998)
|image=Road Wild 98.jpg
|tagline=Road Fast. Road Hard.
No One Knows Where This Road Goes.
|promotion=World Championship Wrestling
|brand = WCWnWo
|date=August 8, 1998
|venue=Sturgis Motorcycle Rally
|city=Sturgis, South Dakota
|attendance=8,500
|lastevent=Bash at the Beach
|nextevent=Fall Brawl
|event=Road Wild
|nextevent2=1999
|lastevent2=1997
}}
The 1998 Road Wild was the third Road Wild professional wrestling pay-per-view (PPV) event produced by World Championship Wrestling (WCW) and co-promoted by WCW and nWo in storyline. It took place on August 8, 1998 from the Sturgis Motorcycle Rally in Sturgis, South Dakota. The event also featured a mini-concert by Travis Tritt after the wrestling matches.

The main event was a tag team match in which Diamond Dallas Page and the host of The Tonight Show, Jay Leno defeated the leader of nWo Hollywood, Hollywood Hogan and Eric Bischoff when Leno pinned Bischoff after Kevin Eubanks delivered a Diamond Cutter to Bischoff. On the undercard, nWo held an invitational battle royal, in which four members of nWo Hollywood and nWo Wolfpac participated along with Goldberg, who won the match by last eliminating The Giant.

Storylines
Road Wild featured nine professional wrestling matches that resulted from scripted storylines and had results predetermined by WCW played out on WCW's television programs Monday Nitro, Thunder, Saturday Night and WorldWide.

On the July 16 episode of Thunder'', The Dancing Fools defeated The Public Enemy after Dancing Fools' associated member Tokyo Magnum was driven through a table and caused the distraction for Dancing Fools to pick up the win, setting up a rematch between the two teams at Road Wild.

Reception
The event had very low buyrates and was panned by critics. 

In 2007, Arnold Furious of 411Mania gave the event a rating of 2.5 [Very Bad], stating, "WCW’s big idea to push for buyrates worked once. This second time out wasn’t so good, money wise. The Leno appearance was actually more entertaining than the basketball players [ Dennis Rodman and Karl Malone] but didn’t pop the same buyrate. I think they missed the point of their direction. Goldberg was world champion but the focus remained on Hogan who the crowd had grown tired of seeing. The undercard had some real horrors on it as well. Two matches sunk well into negative stars for their severe lack of professionalism," with "Jericho-Juvi is good but WCW would soon wreck Jericho. Everything else is bad. Four matches are real shockers. That poor level of professionalism just isn’t acceptable. If I’d have been in charge there would have been heads rolling over this. Keep in mind, this being Road Wild, this show had no money taken at the gate. Another of those bright WCW decisions. Yeah, charging fans to watch your show is pretty straightforward. Most people understand this. Everyone but WCW really. Keeping in mind this is on the back of a Nitro where they showed the entire PPV main event from Bash at the Beach for free. Just to make that huge PPV number shrink in future as fans were outraged they paid to see a match that was then given away. This show is one long string of bad matches and bad booking. Only Jericho’s match is worth watching and [it's] shocking that Jay Leno’s match isn’t the worst on the card by a long shot. Avoid."

Results

Battle royal eliminations

References

Road Wild
1998 in South Dakota
Events in South Dakota
Professional wrestling in Sturgis, South Dakota
August 1998 events in the United States
1998 World Championship Wrestling pay-per-view events